Agere Systems, Inc. was an integrated circuit components company based in Allentown, Pennsylvania. Spun out of Lucent Technologies in 2002, Agere was merged into LSI Corporation in 2007. LSI was in turn acquired by Avago Technologies in 2014. In early 2016, Avago acquired the former Broadcom Corporation, and took on the name Broadcom Inc.

Agere was incorporated on August 1, 2000, as a subsidiary of Lucent Technologies and then spun off on June 1, 2002.  The name Agere was that of a Texas-based electronics company that Lucent had acquired in 2000, although the pronunciations of the company names are different. The Texas company was pronounced with three syllables and a hard "g": . The company name was pronounced with two syllables and a hard "g": .

Apart from the main office in Allentown, the company also maintained offices and facilities in:
 Reading, Pennsylvania, USA: The "Reading Works" facility, formerly Lucent/AT&T and Bell Labs.  Closed in 2003.
 Orlando, Florida, USA: The "Orlando Plant" was Agere's newest wholly owned wafer fabrication facility in the world. Opened in 1984 by AT&T, it was known for a time in the late 1990s as "Cirent Semiconductor" as it was operated as a joint venture between Lucent Technologies and Cirrus Logic Corporation. The Orlando Plant was also home to Bell Labs' Advanced Development and Research Facility (ADRF). Closed in 2005.
 Dallas, Texas, USA: Agere Optoelectronics South (OES), formerly Hermann Technologies.  Acquired 2000, closed 2002.
 Irwindale, California, USA: Acquired by Emcore Corporation.
 Whitefield, India: Located in Bangalore, involved in ASIC design and software development.
 Raanana, Israel: This office was based on Modem-Art, a developer of advanced processor technology for 3G/UMTS mobile devices, which Agere acquired in 2005.
 China: Shanghai and Shenzhen.
 Nieuwegein, Netherlands: This former NCR / AT&T / Lucent Technologies division known under the name WCND (Wireless Communication Network Division) was active in the development of Wi-Fi technology and closed December 2004.
 Ascot, Berkshire, UK: R&D and engineering site developing processor technology for GSM/GPRS/EDGE.
 Tres Cantos, Madrid, Spain: Wafer fab. Manufacturing of 0.3, 0.35 and 0.5 micron CMOS devices. Closed in 2001.

Microsoft sued for alleged theft of IP
Microsoft was sued by Agere for theft of key technology used in Internet telephony. The allegations concern meetings between Agere and Microsoft in 2002 and 2003, where the companies discussed selling Agere's stereophonic acoustic echo cancellation technology to Microsoft. This technology is used to improve the sound of telephone and teleconference communications over the Internet (i.e., VOIP). Just before the agreement was to be signed, Microsoft ended the discussions saying that it made a significant breakthrough in its own, heretofore undisclosed research program, and no longer needed Agere's technology.

References

External links
LSI Corporation Official Website
Agere Systems profile at Yahoo!.
Avago Technologies' Official Website.

2002 establishments in Pennsylvania
2007 disestablishments in Pennsylvania
Alcatel-Lucent
American companies established in 2002
American companies disestablished in 2007
Companies based in Allentown, Pennsylvania
Computer companies established in 2002
Computer companies disestablished in 2007
Defunct companies based in Pennsylvania
Defunct computer companies of the United States
Defunct semiconductor companies of the United States
Fabless semiconductor companies
History of Allentown, Pennsylvania
Technology companies established in 2002
Technology companies disestablished in 2007